Mateusz Ostaszewski (born 27 March 1998) is a Polish former footballer.

Due to recurring injury issues, he retired in August 2020.

External links

References

1998 births
Sportspeople from Białystok
Living people
Polish footballers
Poland youth international footballers
Association football forwards
Jagiellonia Białystok players
Rozwój Katowice players
Widzew Łódź players
Olimpia Zambrów players
II liga players
III liga players